"After Last Night" is a song by American superduo Silk Sonic—which consists of Bruno Mars and Anderson .Paak—with Thundercat and Bootsy Collins. It was solely released as an urban contemporary radio single in the United States on July 5, 2022, by Atlantic Records, and it served as the fifth single from Silk Sonic's debut studio album, An Evening with Silk Sonic (2021). "After Last Night" was written by Mars, Brandon Anderson, Dernst Emile II, James Fauntleroy, Stephen Bruner, Jonathan Yip, Ray Romulus, Jeremy Reeves and Ray Charles McCollough II. The production was handled by Mars, D'Mile, Yip, Romulus, Reeves and McCollough II, with the latter four credited as the Stereotypes. "After Last Night" is a funk, neo soul and R&B ballad, which lyrically details a player who is seen changing his ways for a woman with whom he fell in love.

The track received positive reviews from most music critics, who noted the track's sexiness and praised Thundercat and Collins's appearance. The song reached number 68 on Billboard Hot 100 and 17 on the Hot R&B/Hip-Hop Songs chart in 2021. In the following year, upon its single release, the song reached the top spot of the Billboard Adult R&B Songs chart; this led the album to become the second with four number-one singles on the chart, tying with Toni Braxton's self-titled studio album. Mars and .Paak also sang "After Last Night" during the concert residency, An Evening with Silk Sonic at Park MGM (2022).

Background and release
Bruno Mars spoke about "After Last Night" to Apple Music: "That one got a lot of Bootsy on it. And my boy Thundercat came in and blessed us." He furthered, "everything was built to be played live, so that song is one of those we can keep going for 10 minutes". "After Last Night" was released on July 5, 2022, to US urban adult contemporary radio stations by Atlantic Records as the fifth single from An Evening with Silk Sonic (2021).

Production
"After Last Night" was written by Mars, Anderson .Paak (credited as Brandon Anderson), D'Mile (as Dernst Emile II), James Fauntleroy, Thundercat (as Stephen Bruner), Jonathan Yip, Ray Romulus, Jeremy Reeves and Ray McCullough II. Its production was handled by Mars, D'Mile and the latter four as the Stereotypes. Mars played guitar while D'Mile also played guitar, piano and Rhodes piano. Ella Feingold played additional guitars, while
Krystal Miles sang background vocals. Thundercat played the bass guitar and provided guest vocals alongside Bootsy Collins. Glenn Fischbach played cello, Jonathan Kim and Yoshihiko Nakano were on the viola and Ron Kerber played the flute. Emma Kummrow, Luigi Mazzocchi, Natasha Colkett, Blake Espy, Tess Varley and Chris Jusell played violin. Larry Gold did the arrangement and conducting of the strings at Milkboy Studios, Philadelphia, Pennsylvania, with Jeff Chestek recording them. Collins's vocals were recorded by Tobe Donohue at Rehab Studio in Cincinnati, Ohio. Reeves and Charles Moniz played percussion, while Alex Resoagli played the cabasa. The latter two also engineered and recorded the song at Shampoo Press & Curl Studios. Serban Ghenea mixed "After Last Night" at MixStar Studios in Virginia Beach. John Hanes served as the mix engineer and Bryce Bordone as the mixing assistant. The song was mastered by Randy Merrill at Sterling Sound in New York City.

Composition

Musically, "After Last Night" is a funk, neo soul and R&B song. Its instrumentation features a "subtle" electric guitar and there is a key change towards the end of the song. It starts with a "sensual spoken performance" by Krystal Milesm and as she talks Thundercat is playing the bass and singing "angelically" in the background. His singing has been described as "tender ooos" that are "the sonic equivalent of a rose-colored scarf over a bedside lamp". At one point, both Mars and .Paak replace Thundercat, singing simultaneously about the women they have fallen in love with. As the song goes on, Collins provides amusing lyrics and "swanky spoken word" to complement the song's lyrics. The lyrics describe a woman who is "sweet-sticky/thick and pretty" and who is able to make a "player try on monogamy". Furthermore, Mars and .Paak affirm they will leave their "player lifestyle" following a pleasurable date. The latter also says he will leave "the velvet smoking jackets and giant sunglasses". He throws away his phone, singing in the second verse, "If I still had my phone I'd call every girl I know/And tell them goodbye", a detail which is made pleasant due to Mars's "harmonies on the last syllable".

"After Last Night" is in the key of C minor with a tempo of 71 beats per minute. The vocal ranges span from the low note of G4 to a high note of F6. Jem Aswad writing for Variety described "After Last Night" as "a bedroom ballad with some heavy female breathing and pillow talk". In a similar view, The Harvard Crimson Eugene Ye found the sensuality embedded in the song. Andy Kellman from AllMusic felt similarities between the composition of the song and the Lonely Island's "Dick in a Box" (2009) infused with a "Bootsy-style fantasy sleaze". The lyrics were compared to "The Hunter Gets Captured by the Game" (1966) by the Marvelettes. Paste Candace McDuffie compared the song to the "early-'90s throwback jams a la Mint Condition and Jodeci". Jon Dolan writing for Rolling Stone affirmed that the "stretched-out grooves" of "After Last Night" are so reminiscent of earlier music that the listener expects to hear Teddy Pendergrass at the beginning of the verse.

Critical reception
Most reviewers gave "After Last Night" positive reviews. Ross Scarano, commenting in Pitchfork, called "After Last Night" one of the highlights of An Evening with Silk Sonic, due to its "slathering elevated technique—all those key changes—with satisfying molten cheese". Exclaim! A. Harmony found the track to be "seductive" and that Mars channels his "charm" while singing from "his gut". Similarly, Caleb Campbell of Under the Radar affirmed that "After Last Night" is one of the most seductive tracks by Mars's "smooth lover-man persona". Sophie Williams from NME found moments of "gorgeously subtle flourishes" in the album, such as "the fluttering intake of breath ...around the mix on 'After Last Night. Uproxx's Derrick Rossignol described the song as "smooth and funky" and "chill". Kyle Eustice from HipHopDX praised the feature of Thundercat and Collins, writing that they "pepper the seductive track with their signature touches". Pat Carty, writing for Hot Press, described the single as "sexy" and credited Thundercat and Collins with the song's "horizontal relaxez-vous action". Gigwise Alex Rigotti characterized the single as "glitzy, glamorous, and totally lovestruck" and a "sexy slow jam". Ye found the vocals and instrumentation "sexy". HotNewHipHop writer Joshua Robinson called the track "lush", while Roisin O'Connor from The Independent described it as "sultry". Aswad said the track is "steamy". 

In a mixed review, Sheldon Pearce, for The New Yorker, praised Sonic's "perfect synchronization" as their voices are indissoluble until their solo parts. Nevertheless, Pearce pointed out that "the figure outside the spotlight is always close behind with something to add". Joe Rivers from No Ripcord said the song was "the furthest Silk Sonic deviate from their rigid template". Rivers added that Thundercat's "aqueous bassline" shows a "glimpse" of what the song could have been.

Commercial performance
Following the release of An Evening with Silk Sonic in 2021, "After Last Night" debuted at number 68 on Billboard Hot 100 chart. It also entered the Hot R&B/Hip-Hop Songs at number 17. The song charted at number 92 on the Canadian Hot 100. It debuted at number eight on the New Zealand Hot Singles, which acts as an extension of NZ Top 40 Singles Chart, and peaked at number 78 on the Billboard Global 200. In 2022, following its single release, "After Last Night" topped the Adult R&B Songs chart, becoming the fourth single of Sonic's debut album to do so; this achievement led An Evening with Silk Sonic to become the second album with four number-one singles on the chart, tying with Toni Braxton's self-titled studio album (1993).

Personnel
Credits adapted from the liner notes of An Evening with Silk Sonic:

 Bruno Mars – vocals, songwriting, production, guitar
 Anderson .Paak – vocals, songwriting, drums
 Thundercat – vocals, songwriting, bass
 Bootsy Collins – vocals
 Krystal Miles – background vocals
 James Fauntleroy – songwriting
 Johnathan Yip – songwriting 
 Ray Romulus – songwriting 
 Jeremy Reeves – songwriting 
 Ray McCullough II – songwriting
 D'Mile – songwriting, production, piano, guitar, rhodes 
 The Stereotypes – production
 Ella Feingold – additional guitars
 Glenn Fischbach – cello
 Jonathan Kim – viola
 Yoshihiko Nakano – viola
 Ron Kerber – flute

 Blake Espy – violin
 Chris Jusell – violin
 Tess Varley – violin
 Emma Kummrow – violin
 Luigi Mazzocchi – violin
 Natasha Colkett – violin
 Jeremy Reeves – percussion
 Larry Gold – strings conduction, arrangement 
 Jeff Chestek – strings recording
 Tobe Donohue – vocal recording of Bootsy Collins
 Charles Moniz – recording, engineering, percussion
 Alex Resoagli – engineering assistant, cabasa 
 Serban Ghenea – mixing 
 John Hanes – mixing engineering
 Bryce Bordone – mixing assistant
 Randy Merrill – mastering

Charts

References

2020s ballads
2021 songs
2022 singles
Silk Sonic songs
Anderson .Paak songs
Bruno Mars songs
Bootsy Collins songs
Contemporary R&B ballads
Funk ballads
Neo soul songs
Songs written by Anderson .Paak
Songs written by Bruno Mars
Songs written by D'Mile
Songs written by James Fauntleroy
Songs written by Thundercat (musician)
Songs written by Jonathan Yip
Songs written by Ray Romulus
Songs written by Jeremy Reeves
Songs written by Ray Charles McCullough II
Song recordings produced by the Stereotypes
Soul ballads
Aftermath Entertainment singles
Atlantic Records singles